Adrian Mrowiec (born 1 December 1983 in Wałbrzych) is a Polish professional footballer who plays as a defensive midfielder for Unia Bogaczowice.

Career

Hearts
Mrowiec joined Hearts on loan from FBK Kaunas in 2008 as a holding midfielder. He made his debut against Falkirk in a 2–1 away defeat.

Arka Gdynia
In July 2009, he moved to Arka Gdynia in the Polish Ekstraklasa on a one-year loan.

Return To Hearts
Mrowiec returned to Hearts for a trial spell in 2010 and he subsequently signed a three-year contract. He left Hearts in May 2012 having not being offered a new contract.

Germany
On 18 May 2012, he joined German side RB Leipzig on a two-year contract. He was released by the club without making a league appearance and signed for Chemnitzer FC.

References

External links 

 
 
 

1983 births
Living people
People from Wałbrzych
Polish footballers
Wisła Kraków players
Szczakowianka Jaworzno players
Proszowianka Proszowice players
Arka Gdynia players
FC Vilnius players
FBK Kaunas footballers
Heart of Midlothian F.C. players
Scottish Premier League players
Ekstraklasa players
RB Leipzig players
Chemnitzer FC players
Ruch Chorzów players
Miedź Legnica players
Association football defenders
Polish expatriate footballers
Expatriate footballers in Lithuania
Expatriate footballers in Scotland
Sportspeople from Lower Silesian Voivodeship
3. Liga players